The following is an alphabetical list of articles related to the Republic of Estonia.



0-9
.ee
1992 Estonian parliamentary election
1992 Estonian presidential election
1995 Estonian parliamentary election
1996 Estonian presidential election
1999 Estonian parliamentary election
1st Division (Estonia)
2001 Estonian presidential election
2003 Estonian parliamentary election
2006 Estonian presidential election
2007 cyberattacks on Estonia
2007 Estonian parliamentary election
2011 Estonian cyclists abduction
2011 Estonian parliamentary election
2011 Estonian presidential election
2015 Estonian parliamentary election
2016 Estonian presidential election
2019 Estonian parliamentary election
2021 Estonian presidential election
2nd Division (Estonia)
3rd Division (Estonia)

A
A. Le Coq
Julius Aamisepp
Juhan Aare
Hardo Aasmäe
Johannes Aavik
Juhan Aavik
Jaak Aaviksoo
Abortion in Estonia
Jüri Adams
 Adjacent Nations

Aero Airlines
Aeronaut (company)
Aerosport OY
Aftermath of the Bronze Night
AHHAA
Aiboland
Rein Aidma
Air Livonia
Airest
Ajakirjade Kirjastus
Alatskivi
Alatskivi Castle
Albert of Riga
Alexela
Triin Aljand
Allfilm
Jüri Allik
Martin Allikvee
Andres Alver
Ancient Estonia
Oskar Angelus
Ain Anger
Andrus Ansip
Andrus Ansip's cabinet
Andrus Ansip's second cabinet
Andrus Ansip's third cabinet
Tõnu Anton
Ants Antson
Jaan Anvelt
Apostolic Administration of Estonia
Architecture of Estonia
Paul Ariste
Jüri Arrak
Art Museum of Estonia
Artillery Battalion, 1st Infantry Brigade (Estonia)
AS Franz Krull
AS Starman
August Blues Festival
Autonomous Governorate of Estonia
Märt Avandi
Avies

B
Karl Ernst von Baer
Ksenija Balta
Baltex 2000
Baltic German nobility
Baltic Germans
Baltic Pride
Baltic region
Baltic Sea
Baltic states
Baltic states under Soviet rule (1944–1991)
Baltic Workboats
Baltika Group
Bank of Estonia
Baruto Kaito
Battle for Narva Bridgehead
Battle of Auvere
Battle of Brávellir
Battle of Cēsis (1210)
Battle of Krivasoo
Battle of Laagna
Battle of Lehola
Battle of Lihula
Battle of Lode
Battle of Lyndanisse
Battle of Määritsa
Battle of Muhu
Battle of Narva (1700)
Battle of Narva (1944)
Battle of Otepää (1217)
Battle of Paju
Battle of Porkuni
Battle of Riga (1215)
Battle of St. Matthew's Day
Battle of Tannenberg Line
Battle of Tehumardi
Battle of Turaida (1211)
Battle of Ümera
Battle of Utria
Battle of Varja
Battle of Viljandi
Battle of Viljandi (1223)
Battle of Wesenberg (1268)
Beer in Estonia
Julia Beljajeva
Big Data Scoring
Bigbank
Ado Birk
BLRT Grupp
Girsh Blumberg
Bolt (company)
Bombing of Tallinn in World War II
Bronze Night
Bronze Soldier of Tallinn
Dmitri Bruns
Karl Burman

C
Chocolala
Chocolala Chocolate Museum
Church of the Holy Spirit, Tallinn
Cinema of Estonia
Karl Ernst Claus
Cleveron
Coat of arms of Estonia
Coat of arms of Tallinn
Commander of the Estonian Defence Forces
Commune of the Working People of Estonia
Communist Party of Estonia
Communist Party of Estonia (1990)
Conservative People's Party of Estonia
Constitution of Estonia
Constitution Party (Estonia)
Coop Pank
Cooperative Cyber Defence Centre of Excellence
Copterline
Corded Ware culture
Counties of Estonia
County Governors of Estonia
COVID-19 pandemic in Estonia
Creative Mobile
Crime in Estonia
Culture of Estonia
Cuisine of Estonia
Cybernetica (Estonian company)
CybExer Technologies

D
December Heat
Defence Forces Cemetery of Tallinn
Georg Dehio
Demographics of Estonia
Digital signature in Estonia
Diplomatic missions of Estonia
Duchy of Estonia (1219–1346)
Duchy of Estonia (1561–1721)
Duchy of Livonia
Duke of Estonia

E
e-Estonia
E-Residency of Estonia
Ebajalg
Economy of Estonia
Edelaraudtee
EENet
Ivi Eenmaa
Kaarel Eenpalu
Eesti Ajalehed
Eesti Energia
Eesti Gaas
Eesti Kirjanike Kooperatiiv
Eesti Kiviõli
Eesti Küttejõud
Eesti Laul
Eesti Raamat
Eesti Rahvusringhääling
Eesti Raudtee
Eesti Telefilm
Eesti Televisioon
Eestimaa Õlikonsortsium
Jaan Ehlvest
Jaan Eilart
Jaan Einasto
Aleksander Einseln
Elections in Estonia
Electoral districts of Estonia
Riigikogu electoral district no. 1
Riigikogu electoral district no. 2
Riigikogu electoral district no. 3
Riigikogu electoral district no. 4
Riigikogu electoral district no. 5
Riigikogu electoral district no. 6
Riigikogu electoral district no. 7
Riigikogu electoral district no. 8
Riigikogu electoral district no. 9
Riigikogu electoral district no. 10
Riigikogu electoral district no. 11
Riigikogu electoral district no. 12
Elering
Elion Enterprises Limited
Elisa (company)
ELK Airways
Dina Ellermann
Elron (rail transit)
Emajõgi
Emblem of the Estonian Soviet Socialist Republic
Irina Embrich
EMT (mobile operator)
Tõnu Endrekson
Enefit Kaevandused
Enefit Solutions
Enimex
Era of Silence
Laine Erik
Endla Theatre
Tõnu Endrekson
Ene Ergma
Johannes Erm
Andero Ermel
Aarne Ermus
Johann Friedrich Eschscholtz
Esimene Eesti Põlevkivitööstus
Estcoin
ESTDCU
EstDomains
Estline
Estonia 200
Estonia at the European Athletics Championships
Estonia at the 2022 European Athletics Championships
Estonia at the European Games
Estonia at the European Youth Olympic Festival
Estonia at the Olympics
Estonia at the 1920 Summer Olympics
Estonia at the 1924 Summer Olympics
Estonia at the 1920 Summer Olympics
Estonia at the 1928 Summer Olympics
Estonia at the 1928 Winter Olympics
Estonia at the 1932 Summer Olympics
Estonia at the 1936 Summer Olympics
Estonia at the 1936 Winter Olympics
Estonia at the 1992 Summer Olympics
Estonia at the 1992 Winter Olympics
Estonia at the 1994 Winter Olympics
Estonia at the 1996 Summer Olympics
Estonia at the 1998 Winter Olympics
Estonia at the 2000 Summer Olympics
Estonia at the 2002 Winter Olympics
Estonia at the 2004 Summer Olympics
Estonia at the 2006 Winter Olympics
Estonia at the 2008 Summer Olympics
Estonia at the 2010 Winter Olympics
Estonia at the 2012 Summer Olympics
Estonia at the 2014 Winter Olympics
Estonia at the 2016 Summer Olympics
Estonia at the 2018 Winter Olympics
Estonia at the 2020 Summer Olympics
Estonia at the 2022 Winter Olympics
Estonia at the Paralympics
Estonia at the 1992 Summer Paralympics
Estonia at the 1992 Winter Paralympics
Estonia at the 1994 Winter Paralympics
Estonia at the 1996 Summer Paralympics
Estonia at the 1998 Winter Paralympics
Estonia at the 2000 Summer Paralympics
Estonia at the 2002 Winter Paralympics
Estonia at the 2004 Summer Paralympics
Estonia at the 2008 Summer Paralympics
Estonia at the 2012 Summer Paralympics
Estonia at the 2016 Summer Paralympics
Estonia at the 2020 Summer Paralympics
Estonia at the 2022 Winter Paralympics
Estonia in the Eurovision Song Contest
Estonia in the Eurovision Song Contest 1994
Estonia in the Eurovision Song Contest 1996
Estonia in the Eurovision Song Contest 1997
Estonia in the Eurovision Song Contest 1998
Estonia in the Eurovision Song Contest 1999
Estonia in the Eurovision Song Contest 2000
Estonia in the Eurovision Song Contest 2001
Estonia in the Eurovision Song Contest 2002
Estonia in the Eurovision Song Contest 2003
Estonia in the Eurovision Song Contest 2004
Estonia in the Eurovision Song Contest 2005
Estonia in the Eurovision Song Contest 2006
Estonia in the Eurovision Song Contest 2007
Estonia in the Eurovision Song Contest 2008
Estonia in the Eurovision Song Contest 2009
Estonia in the Eurovision Song Contest 2010
Estonia in the Eurovision Song Contest 2011
Estonia in the Eurovision Song Contest 2012
Estonia in the Eurovision Song Contest 2013
Estonia in the Eurovision Song Contest 2014
Estonia in the Eurovision Song Contest 2015
Estonia in the Eurovision Song Contest 2016
Estonia in the Eurovision Song Contest 2017
Estonia in the Eurovision Song Contest 2018
Estonia in the Eurovision Song Contest 2019
Estonia in the Eurovision Song Contest 2020
Estonia in the Eurovision Song Contest 2021
Estonia in the Eurovision Song Contest 2022
Estonia in World War II
Estonia men's national basketball team
Estonia Piano Factory
Estonian Academy of Music and Theatre
Estonian Agricultural Museum
Estonian Air
Estonian Air Force
Estonian Air Sports Federation
Estonian Americans
Estonian Archery Federation
Estonian Argentines
Estonian art
Estonian Athlete of the Year
Estonian Athletic Association
Estonian Australians
Estonian Autosport Union
Estonian Aviation Museum
Estonian Badminton Federation
Estonian Bandy Association
Estonian Baseball and Softball Federation
Estonian Basketball Association
Estonian Biathlon Union
Estonian Billiard Association
Estonian Biodiversity Party
Estonian Bodybuilding and Fitness Federation
Estonian Boules Federation
Estonian Bowling Association
Estonian Boxing Association
Estonian Canadians
Estonian Canoeing Federation
Estonian Centre Party
Estonian Chess Federation
Estonian Christian Democrats
Estonian Cricket Association
Estonian Culture Film
Estonian Curling Association
Estonian Cyclists' Union
Estonian Dance Sport Association
Estonian Declaration of Independence
Estonian Defence Forces
Estonian Defence League
Estonian Democratic Labour Party
Estonian Disc Golf Association
Estonian Draughts Union
Estonian Encyclopaedia Publishers
Estonian Equestrian Federation
Estonian euro coins
Estonian Evangelical Lutheran Church
Estonian Fencing Federation
Estonian Floorball Union
Estonian Football Association
Estonian folklore
Estonian Free Party
Estonian Golf Association
Estonian government-in-exile
Estonian Greens
Estonian Gymnastics Federation
Estonian Handball Association
Estonian Health Care Museum
Estonian History Museum
Estonian Hunting Sport Association
Estonian Ice Hockey Association
Estonian ID card
Estonian Independence Party
Estonian Internal Security Service
Estonian Judo Association
Estonian Karate Federation
Estonian kroon
Estonian Labour Party
Estonian Land Forces
Estonian language
Estonian Left Party
Estonian LGBT Association
Estonian Literary Museum
Estonian literature
Estonian Lutheran Association of Peace
Estonian Maritime Museum
Estonian Military Academy
Estonian Modern Pentathlon Association
Estonian Motorcycling Federation
Estonian Museum of Applied Art and Design
Estonian Museum of Natural History
Estonian national awakening
Estonian National Independence Party
Estonian National Museum
Estonian National Opera
Estonian nationalism
Estonian native cattle
Estonian Navy
Estonian Olympic Committee
Estonian Open Air Museum
Estonian Orienteering Federation
Estonian Orthodox Church
Estonian Paralympic Committee
Estonian Party for the Future
Estonian Patriotic Movement
Estonian People's Party
Estonian poetry
Estonian Police
Estonian Powerboating Union
Estonian Powerlifting Federation
Estonian Practical Shooting Association
Estonian Ramblers' Association
Estonian Record Productions
Estonian Reform Party
Estonian Restoration of Independence
Estonian Rugby League Federation
Estonian Rugby Union
Estonian Rollerskating Federation
Estonian Rowing Association
Estonian Salvation Committee
Estonian Shipping Company
Estonian Shooting Sport Federation
Estonian Skating Union
Estonian Ski Association
Estonian Social Democratic Independence Party
Estonian Social Democratic Party
Estonian Social Democratic Workers' Party
Estonian Song Festival
Estonian Sovereignty Declaration
Estonian Soviet Socialist Republic
Estonian Sports Museum
Estonian Squash Federation
Estonian State Publishing House
Estonian Sumo Association
Estonian Swedes
Estonian Swimming Federation
Estonian Table Tennis Association
Estonian Taekwondo Federation
Estonian Tennis Association
Estonian Theatre and Music Museum
Estonian Triathlon Association
Estonian Underwater Federation
Estonian United Left Party
Estonian University of Life Sciences
Estonian Volleyball Federation
Estonian War of Independence
Estonian Weightlifting Federation
Estonian Wrestling Federation
Estonian Wushu Kungfu Federation
Estonian Yachting Union
Estonians
ETV+
ETV2
Ita Ever
Exitfilm
Extreme points of Estonia

F
Gustav Fabergé
Fauna of Estonia
Finnish–Estonian defence cooperation
Flag of Estonia
Flag of Tallinn
Flag of the Estonian Soviet Socialist Republic
Flags of Estonian counties
Flyest
Foreign relations of Estonia
Forest Brothers
Bengt Gottfried Forselius
Fortumo
Roman Fosti
Freedom Square, Tallinn

G
Magnus Gabriel De la Gardie
Gauja Estonians
Geography of Estonia
German occupation of Estonia during World War II
Good Hands (film)
GoRail
Governor-General of Baltic provinces
Governorate of Estonia
Governorate of Livonia
Graanul Invest
Great Guild, Tallinn
Great Northern War
Villem Grünthal-Ridala
Gulf of Finland
Gulf of Riga

H
Tiit Haagma
Haanja Parish
Haapsalu
Haapsalu Castle
Haapsalu Horror and Fantasy Film Festival
Haapsalu linnastaadion
Haapsalu railway station
Haapsalu shawl
Haapsalu (urban municipality)
Eugen Habermann
Haltija
Hansa Shipping
Hansabank
Ardo Hansson
Harju County
Harjumaa (ancient county)
Edgar Hark
Headquarters of the Estonian Defence Forces
Georg Hellat
Vambola Helm
Martin Herem
Hermann Castle
History of Estonia
History of the Jews in Estonia
Hiiu County
Hiiumaa
Karoli Hindriks
Johannes Hint
Otto Pius Hippius
Hoiupank
House of Estridsen
House of Hesse
House of Hohenzollern
House of Palatinate-Zweibrücken
House of Romanov
House of Vasa
Jakob Hurt

I
I Am 13
Ice Age Centre
Ida-Viru County
Tullio Ilomets
Toomas Hendrik Ilves
Inbank
Independent Royalist Party of Estonia
Ingrian Finns
Isamaa
ISO 3166-2:EE
Sergei Issakov

J
Merle Jääger
Aleksander Jaakson
Ernst Jaakson
Jaanipäev
Jüri Jaanson
Erich Jacoby
Andrei Jämsä
Peep Jänes
Johann Voldemar Jannsen
Järva County
Martin Järveoja
Neeme Järvi
Paavo Järvi
Raivo Järvi
Eneli Jefimova
JK Narva Trans
Jogentagana
Jõgeva County
Herbert Johanson
Allar Jõks
Gustav Jonson
Philippe Jean-Charles Jourdan
Sven Jürgenson
Steve Jurvetson

K
Kaido Kaaberma
Anu Kaal
Kaali crater
Mart Kadastik
Kadriorg Palace
Louis Kahn
Kalamaja
Kalamaja Cemetery
Kalev (confectioner)
Kalevipoeg
Marina Kaljurand
Kanal 2
Gerd Kanter
Alfred Karindi
Alar Karis
Karjamaa, Tallinn
Tõnis Kasemets
Kersti Kaljulaid
Marina Kaljurand
Kaja Kallas
Kaja Kallas' first cabinet
Kaja Kallas' second cabinet
Siim Kallas
Kanariku
Tanel Kangert
Gerd Kanter
Jüri Käo
Jaan Kaplinski
Raine Karp
Asko Kase
Andres Kasekamp
Carmen Kass
Kassari
Rainer Kattel
Kättemaksukontor
Tunne Kelam
Kelmiküla
Paul Keres
Johannes Kert
Kiek in de Kök, Tallinn
Kingdom of Livonia
Kihnu
Kihnu Veeteed
Kiiking
Kaljo Kiisk
Jaan Kiivit Jr.
Jaan Kiivit Sr.
Krista Kilvet
Tõnis Kint
Riina Kionka
Erika Kirpu
Magnus Kirt
Kaidi Kivioja
Andrus Kivirähk
Mihkel Klaassen
Eri Klas
August Koern
Paul Kogerman
Wolfgang Köhler
Eston Kohver
Anett Kontaveit
Lydia Koidula
Kopli
Kopli cemetery
Johan Kõpp
Kaie Kõrb
Korvpalli Meistriliiga
Nikolai Köstner
Taavi Kotka
Alar Kotli
Tarmo Kõuts
Kratt
Aleksander Kreek
Kreenholm Manufacturing Company
Friedrich Reinhold Kreutzwald
Arvo Krikmann
Eerik-Niiles Kross
Hasso Krull
Arvo Kruusement
Jakob Kukk
Kumu (museum)
Kunda culture
Ernst Gustav Kühnert
Eerik Kumari
Vilen Künnapu
Kuressaare
Kuressaare Castle
Kuukulgur Film
Kristin Kuuba
Edgar-Johan Kuusik

L
Lääne County
Lääne-Viru County
Ants Laaneots
Mart Laar
Endel Laas
Johan Laidoner
Laiuse Castle
Lake Peipus
Lake Ülemiste
Anu Lamp
Rein Lang
Languages of Estonia
Leonhard Lapin
Lasnamäe
Legal Information Centre for Human Rights
Legends of Tallinn
Katrina Lehis
Ilse Lehiste
Toomas Leius
Lennart Meri Tallinn Airport
Kalju Lepik
Robert Lepikson
Ignace Lepp
Peeter Lepp
Allar Levandi
LGBT rights in Estonia
LHV Pank
Libertas Estonia
Jürgen Ligi
Kaarel Liidak
Linda Line
Lingvist
Dmitri Linter
Heino Lipp
Elmar Lipping
List of active Estonian Navy ships
EML Admiral Cowan
EML Sakala (M314)
EML Ugandi
EML Wambola (A433)
List of banks in Estonia
List of cities and towns in Estonia
List of equipment of the Estonian Defence Forces
List of Estonian Americans
List of Estonian films
List of Estonian flags
List of Estonians
List of historic Estonian Navy ships
EML Admiral Pitka
EML Kalev (1936)
EML Kalev (M414)
EML Lembit
EML Olev
EML Sulev (M312)
EML Tasuja
EML Vaindlo
EML Wambola (M311)
List of islands of Estonia
List of members of the Riigikogu
List of members of the Riigikogu, 1995-1999
List of members of the Riigikogu, 1999-2003
List of members of the Riigikogu, 2003-2007
List of members of the Riigikogu, 2007-2011
List of members of the Riigikogu, 2011-2015
List of members of the Riigikogu, 2015-2019
List of museums in Estonia
List of radio stations in Estonia
List of rulers of Estonia
List of streets in Tallinn
List of World Heritage Sites in Estonia
Liviko
Livonia
Livonian Brothers of the Sword
Livonian Crusade
Livonian Order
Livonian War
Liwathon E.O.S.
Elmar Lohk
Janika Lõiv
Loodus
Uno Loop
Pavel Loskutov
Mihhail Lotman
Lotte and the Moonstone Secret
Lotte from Gadgetville
Jüri Luik
Viivi Luik
Luminor Bank
Karin Luts

M
Maa-alused
Maasilinna Castle
Ülle Madise
Epp Mäe
Hjalmar Mäe
Laine Mägi
Rasmus Mägi
Tõnis Mägi
Maiasmokk
Jaan Maide
Kadri Mälk
Raul Mälk
Linnart Mäll
Jaan Manitski
Harry Männil
Maret Maripuu
Heinrich Mark
Ülar Mark
Ago Markvardt
Margaret Markvardt
Friedrich Martens
Ann Marvet
Roman Matsov
Alo Mattiisen
Maxima Group
Mees, kes teadis ussisõnu
Lennart Meri
Merilaid & Co.
Merimetsa
Andres Metsoja
Michael Pärt Musik
MicroLink
Mikkel Museum
Military history of Estonia
Military of Estonia
Grigori Minaškin
Minister of Defence (Estonia)
Minister of Finance (Estonia)
Minister of Foreign Affairs (Estonia)
Ministry of Defence (Estonia)
Ministry of Finance (Estonia)
Ministry of Foreign Affairs (Estonia)
Ministry of Justice (Estonia)
Ministry of Social Affairs (Estonia)
Milrem Robotics
Misso Parish
Mõhu
Mõigu Cemetery
Jüri Mõis
Mõniste Parish
Monument of Lihula
Moonsund Operation
Moonwalk Records
MS Estonia
Mu isamaa, mu õnn ja rõõm
Muhu
Municipalities of Estonia
Peeter Mudist
Hilje Murel
Museum of Estonian Architecture
Museum of Fight for Estonia's Freedom
Museum of New Art, Pärnu
Museum of Occupations
Music of Estonia
Raul Must
Margit Mutso
Mihkel Mutt

N
Heiki Nabi
Naissaar
Narva
Narva Bay
Narva Castle
Narva culture
Narva Offensive (1–4 March 1944)
Narva Offensive (15–28 February 1944)
Narva Offensive (18–24 March 1944)
Narva Offensive (July 1944)
Narva Power Plants
Narva River
Narva Town Hall
National Coalition Party Pro Patria
National Committee of the Republic of Estonia
National symbols of Estonia
Robert Natus
Nelja Energia
Aarni Neuvonen
New Consolidated Gold Fields
Next Estonian parliamentary election
NG Investeeringud
Ellen Niit
Nochnoy Dozor (advocacy group)
Rainer Nõlvak
Erki Nool
Nordea
Nordic identity in Estonia
Nordica (airline)
Nortal
Northern Baltic Communist Youth League
Northern Crusades
Nikolai Novosjolov
Nitrofert
Elmo Nüganen
Ülo Nugis
Nukufilm
Tiidrek Nurme
Nurmekund

O
Agnes Oaks
Obtshak
Oil shale in Estonia
Valter Ojakäär
Kristiina Ojuland
Evald Okas
Old Thomas
Olerex
Peeter Olesk (literary scientist)
Peeter Olesk (sport shooter)
Omniva
OMX Tallinn
Õnne 13
Margus Oopkaup
Operail
Operation Beowulf
Lembit Öpik
Order of the White Star
Orto (company)
Otepää
Otepää village
Rein Otsason
Siiri Oviir

P
Heini Paas
Ivari Padar
Ain Padrik
Imbi Paju
Kuno Pajula
Pakri Islands
Paldiski
Paljassaare
Reet Palm
Urve Palo
Tõnis Palts
Uno Palu
Anton Palvadre
Arvi Parbo
Lagle Parek
Pärispea
Erast Parmasto
Priit Pärn
Reena Pärnat
Pärnu
Pärnu Airport
Pärnu Bay
Pärnu County
Pärnu Museum
Pärnu River
Juhan Parts
Kaija Parve
Konstantin Päts
Heino Pehk
Pehmed ja karvased
Pelgulinn
Pelguranna
Keit Pentus
People's Party of Republicans and Conservatives
Perioodika
Petseri County
Hanno Pevkur
Jüri Pihl
Ants Piip
Helmut Piirimäe
Pikk Hermann
Aavo Pikkuus
Pipedrive
Felix Pirts
Johan Pitka
Plumbr
Andres Põder
Põhja-Tallinn
Põhjala Brewery
Political parties in Estonia
Politics of Estonia
Juri Poljans
Põltsamaa Castle
Põlva County
Popular Front of Estonia
President of Estonia
Presidential Palace (Tallinn)
Uno Prii
Prime Minister of Estonia
Pro Patria Union
Propeller (band)
Peeter Pruus
Public holidays in Estonia
Publishing House ERSEN
Jaan Puhvel
Mihkel Pung
Helmi Puur
Ludvig Puusepp
Raivo Puusepp
Ingrid Puusta
Heino Puuste

Q
Quattromed

R
Raadio 2
Ilmar Raag
Mari Raamot
Jaan Rääts
Radio Factory RET
Raekoja plats, Tallinn
Raggie
Hugo Bernhard Rahamägi
Rahva Raamat
Jüri Raidla
Katri Raik
Allar Raja
Rakvere Lihakombinaat
Karl-Martin Rammo
Konstantin Ramul
Valdo Randpere
Rapla County
Märt Rask
Jüri Ratas
Jüri Ratas' first cabinet
Jüri Ratas' second cabinet
Jüri Rätsep
Rein Raud
Raudwara
Karl Rebane
Reichskommissariat Ostland
Records 2000
Nikolai Reek
August Rei
Jaan Rekkor
Renard (motorcycle)
Res Publica Party
Resurrection of Christ Cathedral, Narva
Revala
Riigikogu
Rimi Baltic
Taavi Rõivas
Taavi Rõivas' first cabinet
Taavi Rõivas' second cabinet
Inna Rose
Jacques Rosenbaum
Alfred Rosenberg
Rõuge Parish
Rove Digital
Ruja
Paul-Eerik Rummo
Russian Party in Estonia
Russian Social Democratic Party of Estonia
Russians in Estonia
Arnold Rüütel
Ingrid Rüütel

S
Saare County
Saaremaa
Saaremaa Rally
Saaremaa Shipping Company
Mart Saarma
Saarte Investeering
August Sabbe
Eugen Sacharias
Grete Šadeiko
Edgar V. Saks
Saku Brewery
Erika Salumäe
Tiit Salumäe
Rainer Sarnet
Jaan Sarv
Jüri Saska
Edgar Savisaar
Scoro
Seaplane Harbour
SEB Pank
Helir-Valdor Seeder
Indrek Sei
Mart Seim
Hanno Selg
Sellest mustast mungast
Selver
Ott Sepp
Seto dialect
Setomaa
Setos
Siege of Tallinn
Siege of Tartu (1224)
Mart Siimann
Olev Siinmaa
Johannes Sikkar
Jüri Sillart
Silmet
Peeter Simm
Sindi
Singing Revolution
Riivo Sinijärv
Artur Sirk
Mark Sirõk
Urmas Sisask
Sitsi
Sky Media Group
Skype
SmartLynx Airlines Estonia
SmartPOST
Kristina Šmigun-Vähi
Social Democratic Party (Estonia)
Tiit Sokk
Sokos Hotel Viru
Tarmo Soomere
Enn Soosaar
Soviet deportations from Estonia
Soviet occupation of the Baltic states (1940)
Soviet occupation of the Baltic states (1944)
Soviet Union
Soviet westward offensive of 1918–19
Spicetone
Sport in Estonia
Spouse of the President of Estonia
St. John's Church, Tallinn
St. Mary's Cathedral, Tallinn
St. Nicholas Church, Tallinn
St. Olaf's Church, Tallinn
St. Peter and St. Paul's Cathedral, Tallinn
Starship Technologies
State continuity of the Baltic states
State of the Teutonic Order
Stenbock House
Stephanos of Tallinn
Otto August Strandman
STV AS
Olev Subbi
Gustav Suits
Tiit Sukk
Gustav Sule
Anne Sulling
Supreme Court of Estonia
Arnold Susi
Riho Suun
Swedish Livonia
Swedish People's League in the Baltic Sea Provinces

T
Rein Taagepera
Veikko Täär
Hilana Taarka
Kaspar Taimsoo
Take It or Leave It (2018 film)
Tallink
Tallinn
Tallinn Ballet School
Tallinn Black Nights Film Festival
Tallinn Botanic Garden
Tallinn City Museum
Tallinn Legends
Tallinn Offensive
Tallinn Stock Exchange
Tallinn Town Hall
Tallinn University
Tallinn University of Technology
Tallinna Kaubamaja Group
Tallinna Linnatranspordi AS
Tallinnfilm
Jaan Talts
Janar Talts
Jaak Tamm
Jüri Tamm
Aleksander Tammert
Alexei Tammet-Romanov
Elmar Tampõld
Ott Tänak
Tänapäev
Andres Tarand
Indrek Tarand
Enn Tarto
Tartu
Tartu Art Museum
Tartu County
Tartu Mill
Tartu Offensive
Tartu Toy Museum
Tarvastu Castle
Taska Film
TBB pank
Telephone numbers in Estonia
Television in Estonia
Telia Eesti
Ann Tenno
Teutonic Order
Terra Mariana
Riho Terras
The Class (2007 film)
THeMIS
Otto Tief
Simmu Tiik
Elmo Tiisvald
Karel Tilga
Rudolf Tobias
Toggl Track
Tondi Elektroonika
Tõnismägi
Jaan Tõnisson
Tõnu Tõniste
Jaan Toomik
Alfred Tooming
Toompea
Toompea Castle
Harriet Toompere
TopTen
Tourism in Estonia
TransferWise
Transport in Estonia
Hans Trass
TravelSim
Treaty of Dorpat
Treaty of Tartu (Estonia–Russia)
Treaty of Tartu (Finland–Russia)
Eerik-Juhan Truuväli
TS Laevad
Svetlana Tširkova-Lozovaja
TTÜ-A. Le Coq
TTÜ/A. Le Coq
Endel Tulving
Tuulepealne maa
Erkki-Sven Tüür
Type-X (unmanned ground vehicle)

U
Jüri-Mikk Udam
Anton Uesson
Ugandi County
Maicel Uibo
Ülemiste
Ülemiste Centre
Lembit Ulfsak
Kauksi Ülle
Jüri Uluots
Universities in Estonia
University of Tartu
University of Tartu basketball team
University of Tartu Museum
University of Tartu Press
Mati Unt
Utilitas (company)
Jaak Uudmäe
Jaanus Uudmäe
Jan Uuspõld

V
Debora Vaarandi
Andrus Vaarik
Ken-Marti Vaher
Kristina Vähi
Tiit Vähi
Liina Vahtrik
Vaiga
Väinameri
Vaino Väljas
Viire Valdma
Valga County
Valgus (publisher)
Edgar Valter
Arvo Valton
Vanalinn
Vanalinnastuudio
Vanemuine
Vanilla Ninja
Vaps Movement
Andrus Värnik
Varrak
Varstu Parish
Lauri Vaska
Andrus Veerpalu
Kalle Vellevoog
Veriff
Priit Vesilind
Arnold Viiding
Urmas Viilma
Tiit-Rein Viitso
Vikerraadio
Viking Age in Estonia
Priit Vilba
Ain Vilde
Ülo Vilimaa
Viljandi County
Jüri Vilms
Toomas Vilosius
Mart Vilt
Viru Brewery
Viru Keemia Grupp
Viru Keskus
Virumaa
Kihnu Virve
Artur Vititin
VKG Elektrivõrgud
Hardi Volmer
Ulvi Voog
Votes
Vormsi
Võros
Võrtsjärv
Võru County

W
Waldhof (factory)
Walls of Tallinn
War of Independence Victory Column
Aleksander Warma
Weekdone
West Estonian archipelago
Ilon Wikland
Wind power in Estonia

X

Y

Z
ZeroTurnaround
Kregor Zirk
Werner Zoege von Manteuffel



See also

Lists of country-related topics - similar lists for other countries.

Estonia